The 35ft 6in Self-righting motor-class  was a  displacement hull lifeboat built in single engine form between 1929 and 1940 and in twin-engined form between 1947 and 1950. The boats were operated by the Royal National Lifeboat Institution between 1929 and 1965.

History
The need to provide motor lifeboats at stations using carriage launching had first been addressed with the  Self-righting motor type of 1921. Three of these boats were built and were to all intents and purposes pulling and sailing boats with an auxiliary engine. The definitive boat for production appeared in 1929,  longer and with the same  beam as the second and third 35ft types. After the first two boats had been put on station, a crash programme of production was instituted in 1931 and twelve boats were produced that year. In common with the similar but non self-righting Liverpool-class, post war production switched to twin-engined versions, but only five were built. The RNLI was increasingly switching to more stable non self-righting lifeboats and the single engine 35ft 6in Self-righting motors were replaced at most stations by Liverpool-class boats in the early 1950s after only around twenty years service. The twin-engined boats had even shorter lives, being replaced at three stations by Liverpools and at the other two by  s after less than fifteen years service.

Description
The single RNLI-designed, Weyburn Engineering built AE6 6-cylinder petrol engine produced 35 bhp and sat in a watertight engine room beneath pent roof access hatches ahead of an aft cockpit shelter from which the mechanic operated the engine controls. Apart from a small shelter forward the boats were open. As described above, beam was increased during production in an attempt to improve stability. The first two of these boats were powered by two 18bhp Weyburn AE4 4-cylinder petrol engines, but the final three had 20bhp Ferry FKR3 3 cylinder diesels.

Fleet

Single engine

Twin engine

External links
RNLI